Dadohaehaesang National Park was designated in 1981 as the largest national park in South Korea. Main attractions of Dadohaehaesang National Park are Hongdo, Heuksando and Baekdo. In terms of biodiversity, 1,541 plant species, more than 11 mammal species including even orca or killer whales, 147 bird species, 885 insect species, 13 amphibious reptile species, 154 ocean water fish species, and 11 freshwater fish species have inhabited in this area.

See also
Sinan Dadohae Biosphere Reserve

References

External links
The park's page on Korea National Park Service's website

National parks of South Korea
Protected areas established in 1981
Parks in South Jeolla Province